Brent Rademaker, is a musician, formerly of The Tyde and Beachwood Sparks.

He was also in Frausdots, a band with Michelle Loiselle, a former backing singer for Guns N' Roses, Carl Tapia, Roger Brogan, Exiquio Talavera and David Baum. Their debut album, Couture, Couture, Couture, features guest appearances from Roger O'Donnell of The Cure, Rob Campanella and Hunter Crowley of Brian Jonestown Massacre and Mia Doi Todd. Rademaker also fronts the band GospelbeacH.

Albums

With Frausdots 
Couture, Couture, Couture (Subpop, 2004)

With GospelbeacH 
Pacific Surf Line (Alive Naturalsound Records, 2015)
Another Summer Of Love, (Alive Naturalsound Records, 2017)
Another Winter Alive, (Alive Naturalsound Records, 2018)
Let It Burn, (Alive Naturalsound Records, 2019)

References

External links
 Frausdots at MySpace
 Frausdots at Subpop

Indie rock musical groups from California
Musical groups from Los Angeles
Rocket Girl artists
Year of birth missing (living people)
Living people